Better Day  is the forty-third solo studio album by American singer-songwriter Dolly Parton. It was released on June 28, 2011, by Dolly Records and Warner Music Nashville. The album was produced by Parton and Kent Wells. To promote the album, Parton embarked on her Better Day World Tour. With 49 shows, the tour visited North America, Europe, and Australia.

Background
Parton first mentioned plans for a new album in October 2010 during an interview with The Huntsville Times. She said she was currently working on the album which will "have some uplifting gospel flavor and some country." She went on to say that she plans to tour "in the fall and winter" in Europe and Australia. It was announced in January 2011 that the album's title would be Better Day.

Content
Better Day contains entirely original material, her first since Hungry Again. However, only six of the album's twelve tracks are exclusively new. Four of the songs on Better Day, "I Just Might", "Shine Like the Sun", "Get Out and Stay Out" and "Let Love Grow" are Parton's personally recorded versions of songs she wrote for the Broadway adaptation of her 1980 movie 9 to 5. "Holding Everything" was previously written for and recorded by Randy Owen on his debut album, One on One. 

In an interview with Billboard, it was noted that the songs on the album are thematically linked, in that they are all inspirational. Parton replied with, "We actually did demo a lot of songs for this and it seemed that with everything being so doomsday-terrorists and bad weather and unemployment-we need a little sunshine. I wanted to do something people would want to hear." Parton told The National Post that the album inspired in part by such disparate world problems as the Japanese tsunami, the ongoing conflict in the Middle East and America's economic crisis". Parton added, "I don't write just to relieve my own anxieties, I write for the people who can't express themselves." She concluded by saying, "I can't save the world, but I might be able to save someone today if I can put them in a better mood. The music's designed to be like a ray of sunshine for all those folks in the dark."

Release and promotion 
The first single from the album, "Together You and I," was premiered on The Ellen DeGeneres Show on May 27, 2011. Parton has already begun promotion of the tour and album, including across the BBC  and ITV  in the United Kingdom  in April 2011. The album was released on CD, vinyl and digital download.

The album's lead single, "Together You and I" was released on May 23, 2011 to digital retailer, iTunes. A video for the single was filmed, and was originally scheduled to debut on May 28. However, for unknown reasons, the video was delayed and later debuted on July 4 on country music video station, CMT. The video was directed by acclaimed CMT Music Awards "Video Director of the Year", Trey Fanjoy. "The Sacrifice" was released as the album's second and final single, and a music video was created using live footage from Parton's Better Day World Tour.

Critical reception 

Better Day has received positive reviews from most music critics. At Metacritic, which assigns a normalized rating out of 100 to reviews from mainstream critics, the album received an average score of 72, based on 19 reviews, which indicates "generally favorable reviews". Mikael Wood of the Los Angeles Times stated, "Stylistically, “Better Day” lands somewhere between Parton's recent bluegrass albums and 2008's “Backwoods Barbie”", and praised of Parton, "[her] irrepressible personality is the star attraction, and on “Better Day” it shines.". Elysa Gardner of USA Today gave Better Day three out of four stars, and wrote "this age-defying country girl, with her resilient soprano and infectious pluck, seems incapable of a truly false note." Entertainment Weeklys Ken Tucker wrote, "In the midst of hard economic times, the positive anthems that fill Better Day [...] come off as brilliant strategy, with some equally brilliant vocal performances." Tucker added to this, with his review for NPR's Fresh Air, stating, "There's a sincere and earnest quality to this music that enables it to stand apart from so much of the trumped-up emotionalism and cheesy irony of the pop-music world all around it." In a favorable review, Billboard's Phil Gallo exclaimed, "The album's dozen story songs [..] are filled with uplifting sentiment and words of encouragement set against a variety of backdrops, most of them deeply rooted in country traditions rather than acquiescing to radio demands", and claimed that the album's mid-tempo songs, "leap out and beg to be played on the radio."

The New York Times writer Nate Chinen offered praise for Parton's "almost ageless" vocals. Holly Gleason of Paste Magazine stated that Parton, "juxtaposes superstardom with her down-home comfort zone" and continued that the album is a "pop-country gem that empowers as it punches country radio’s clichés with a freshness".
Allmusic'''s Steve Leggett commended that Better Day is, "an energetic, spirited, and hopeful outing that rocks and soars with enough musical sunshine to light up even the grayest day" and wrote that Parton, "has never sounded fresher or more spirited [...] she shows she still knows how to write a timeless song."The Washington Posts Allison Stewart stated that Better Day is a "restless jumble of styles weighted toward mainstream country", and that the album "is only as great as it needs to be". Carla Gillis of NOW panned the album's "eye-rolling Dollyisms", but complimented that Parton's vocals were "as strong, clear and distinct as ever."

Commercial performanceBetter Day debuted at number 51 on the Billboard 200 albums chart with first week sales of 17,500. The album also debuted at number 11 on the Billboard'' Top Country Albums chart. In the UK, the album was released on August 29, 2011 and debuted at No. 9 on the UK Album Charts, becoming Parton's highest charting studio album in that country as well as becoming a No.1 on the UK Country Albums Chart

Track listing

Personnel
Adapted from the album liner notes.

 Kii Arens – Art Direction
 Mike Brignardello – Bass guitar
 Matt Coles – Assistant
 Jamie Dailey – Background Vocals 
 Christian Davis – Background Vocals
 Michael Davis – Hammond B3 Organ, Synthesizer
 Richard Dennison – Background Vocals
 Kyle Dickinson – Assistant
 Allen Ditto – Assistant
 Peter Dokus – Photo Assistance
 Lloyd Green – Steel Guitar
 Andy Hall – Dobro
 Vicki Hampton – Background Vocals 
 Emmylou Harris – Background Vocals on track 3
 Aubrey Haynie – Fiddle, Mandolin
 Steve Hinson – Steel Guitar, Slide Guitar
 Paul Hollowell – Hammond B3 Organ, Keyboards, Piano
 Becky Isaacs – Background Vocals 
 Sonya Isaacs – Background Vocals 
 Randy Kohrs – Dobro
 Alison Krauss – Background Vocals on track 3
 Rob McNelley – Electric Guitar 
 Jerry McPherson – Electric Guitar 
 Steve Mackey – Bass guitar, Upright Bass
 Stephen Marcussen – Mastering
 Brent Mason – Electric Guitar
 Jimmy Mattingly – Fiddle, Mandolin
 Patrick Murphy – Engineering, Mixing
 Jennifer O'Brien – Background Vocals
 Richie Owens – Harmonica
 Dolly Parton – Composer, Executive Producer, Lead Vocals, Background Vocals
 Cheryl Riddle – Hair Stylist
 Hargus "Pig" Robbins – Piano
 Ben Schmitt – Assistant
 Tony Smith – Engineer
 Fran Strine – Photography
 Steve Summers – Costume Design
 Bryan Sutton – Acoustic Guitar
 Dave Talbot – Banjo
 Steve Turner – Drums, Percussion
 Darrin Vincent – Background Vocals
 Biff Watson – Acoustic Guitar 
 Kent Wells – Acoustic Guitar, Electric Guitar, Producer, Background Vocals
 Stewart Whitmore – Digital Editing

Charts

Release history

References

2011 albums
Dolly Parton albums